Liverpool Football Club Women is an English women's football club, founded in 1989 as Newton LFC and subsequently renamed Knowsley United WFC and Liverpool Ladies. A founding member of the top-tier FA Women's Super League in 2011, Liverpool will compete in the 2022–23 FA WSL having won the 2021–22 FA Women's Championship.

Liverpool became the first English women's football club to offer all players full-time professional contracts prior to the 2013 FA WSL season. This decision pioneered the professionalisation of women's football in England and led to Liverpool's first FA WSL title in 2013; they then retained the title in 2014.

History
The club was founded in 1989 as Newton LFC, by former England international, Liz Deighan. The club rechristened as Knowsley United WFC two years later; becoming the founding members of the National Premier Division organised by the WFA. Knowsley United reached the final of the Premier League Cup in 1993, but lost to Arsenal at Wembley. The local MP, Eddie O'Hara, tabled an Early Day Motion congratulating the club on extending the annual sequence of Merseyside clubs playing in Cup finals at Wembley. In 1994, the club reached the final of the FA Women's Cup, but lost 1–0 to Doncaster Belles at Glanford Park.

In mid-1994, the club linked with Liverpool F.C. and took on the name Liverpool Ladies F.C.

The club finished runners-up in the following two FA Women's Cups. They lost the 1995 final 3–2 to Arsenal at Prenton Park; after twice being ahead through Karen Burke goals, Marieanne Spacey scored a late winner for Arsenal. In the 1996 final, Liverpool and their 15-year-old goalkeeper Rachel Brown, drew 1–1 with Croydon at The Den, but ultimately lost on penalties after extra time.

For most of the 1990s Liverpool were National Premier League mainstays but a lack of support and investment saw them relegated to the Northern Division in 2003. In 2004, they won the Northern Division and earned promotion, but did not stay long as they were relegated again at the end of the season, having won only two games.

As in the men's game, their biggest rivalry is with Everton, but their recent spells in the second tier have led them to develop rivalry with counterparts of lower-level male rivals, such as Tranmere Rovers and Lincoln Ladies. The Merseyside derby was rekindled in the 2007–08 season, after Liverpool won back promotion as 2006–07 Northern Division champions.

Surviving their first season back in the FA Women's Premier League National Division, finishing third bottom, they sacked manager David Bradley at the end of the season. The club were relegated into the Northern Division for 2009–10, but won the league losing just one game all season. Liverpool also won the FA Fair Play Award after playing for the whole season without having a single player booked or sent-off.

Liverpool was one of eight founding teams in the FA WSL in April 2011.

In June 2012, the manager for four seasons Robbie Johnson stepped down from his position. Under Johnson, the team won just two of their 20 games in his last two seasons in charge, having finished bottom in 2011, and with a similar record in 2012. Johnson's assistant Andy Williams was subsequently promoted to the manager's role.

In August 2012, Matt Beard, who had left Chelsea the previous month, was appointed manager on a full-time contract until 2014. When the club finished bottom of the WSL for the second successive season, Beard overhauled his squad by releasing ten players and making high-profile signings including United States national team defender Whitney Engen. The club then announced a move from the West Lancashire College Stadium in Skelmersdale, to the Halton Stadium in Widnes for 2013. On 29 September 2013, Liverpool Ladies clinched their first Women's Super League title by beating Bristol in the end-of-season decider, ending Arsenal's nine-year dominance of women's football in England. They retained the title on 12 October 2014 by beating Bristol 3–0 despite entering the final day in third behind Chelsea and Birmingham City.

In September 2015, it was announced that Matt Beard was leaving the club at the conclusion of the 2015 season to take charge of Boston Breakers in the United States. Liverpool had a difficult season, plagued by players' injuries and managing a 7th-place finish in the FA WSL, semifinals of the FA WSL Cup, fifth round of the FA Women's Cup and round of 32 of the Women's Champions League. In October 2015, Scott Rogers, who was Matt Beard's assistant coach, was officially appointed as manager.

On 19 April 2017, the club announced a landmark shirt sponsorship deal with beauty and cosmetics company Avon Products. This three-year agreement will see Avon become the first independent shirt sponsor for the club, replacing Standard Chartered from the men's side. As part of the agreement, Avon will also become Liverpool Ladies FC's principal partner and ladies beauty partner.

In July 2018, the club rebranded as Liverpool Football Club Women.

In the 2019–20 FA WSL season, Liverpool Women finished last, and as a result, were relegated to the FA Women's Championship, after being in the WSL since its inception. In the 2020–21 FA Women's Championship season, Liverpool Women finished 3rd, after a 1–1 draw at home to Blackburn Rovers ended their promotion hopes. In May 2021, Matt Beard was announced as Liverpool Women's manager. Under Matt's second stint with the club, Liverpool Women won the 2021–22 FA Women's Championship with two games in hand, and earned their promotion back to the FA Women's Super League.

Players

Current squad

Out-on-loan

Former players
For details of current and former players, see :Category:Liverpool F.C. Women players.

Players' Player of the Year
Awarded at the Liverpool FC end-of-season Players' Awards Dinner.

Staff

Managerial history

Seasons

Record in UEFA Women's Champions League 

All results (away, home and aggregate) list Liverpool FC Women's goal tally first.

Honours

Leagues 

 FA Women's Premier League National Division / FA Women's Super League (Level 1)
 Winners (2): 2013, 2014
 Runners-up (1): 1994–95
 FA Women's Premier League Northern Division / FA Women's Championship (Level 2)
 Winners (4): 2003–04, 2006–07, 2009–10, 2021–22
 Runners-up (1): 2005–06

Cups 
 FA Women's Cup
 Runners-up (3): 1993–94, 1994–95, 1995–96
 FA Women's National League Cup
 Runners-up (1): 1992–93
 Keele Classic
 Winners (1): 2010
 Preston Tournament
 Winners (1): 2010

Recognitions 
 FA Club of the Year
 Winners (1): 2014

References

External links

 Official website
 Liverweb Ladies (archived)

 
Women's football clubs in England
Liverpool F.C.
Football clubs in Liverpool
Metropolitan Borough of Knowsley
Association football clubs established in 1989
1989 establishments in England
FA WSL 1 teams
FA Women's National League teams